Tricyrtis formosana, the toad lily, is an East Asian species of herbaceous plant in the lily family. It is native to Taiwan and to Nansei-shoto (also known as the Ryukyu Islands, part of Japan).

The Latin specific epithet formosana refers to the former name of Taiwan, Formosa.

Description 

The flowers are trumpet-shaped, white or light purple with prominent darker purple spots.

Varieties
 Tricyrtis formosana var. formosana - Taiwan, Iriomote
 Tricyrtis formosana var. glandosa (T.Shimizu) T.S.Liu & S.S.Ying - Taiwan

References

External links

formosana
Plants described in 1879
Flora of Eastern Asia